Joan Walsh-Smith (born 1946) is an Australian sculptor who works in a variety of mediums and materials. Walsh-Smith has worked on several large-scale memorials throughout Australia. Her most well-known work is the National Australian Army Memorial in Canberra.

Early work 
Joan was born in Ireland in 1946. She studied at the National College of Art and Design in Dublin, graduating in 1971. It was here that she met her husband and collaborative partner, Charles Smith. She was awarded her first public commission in 1972, for Gryphon, a 3m x 2m stone carving, located at the Northern Bank, Waterford, Ireland. In 1974 she won the Northern Ireland Arts Council's Art in Context: Public Sculpture Competition, with City People, a 30m bas-relief.

Western Australia 
In 1984, Joan immigrated to Western Australia, with her husband, Charlie Smith and their 3 children, Carl, Joanne and Raoul. With her husband she set up Smith Sculptors in Gidgegannup, Western Australia. Joan won her first major Australian commission in 1988, when Smith Sculptors was awarded the National Australian Army memorial project.

Awards 
The Smith Sculptors were awarded the Centenary Medal for Outstanding Achievement in the field of ‘Large Scale Public Art’ in 2001 and were finalists for WA Citizen of the Year in 2008. In 2012, they were both awarded Rotary International Paul Harris Fellowship Medals.

Memorial artworks 

 HMAS Sydney II Memorial, Geraldton, WA
 Hugo Throssell VC 100th Anzac Memorial, Northam, WA
 National Australian Army Memorial, Canberra
 Pearl Diver Memorial, Broome, WA
 Indigenous Female Pearl Diver Memorial, Broome, WA
 Memorial to the Dying Elm
 Kobe Earthquake Memorial
 John Curtin Memorial
 Ocean Reef 100th ANZAC Memorial
 Dolphin Memorial
 Onslow War Memorial
 Onslow Memorial Cemetery Gates
 The Catalpa Memorial
 Memorial to the Migrant Children
 Memorial to HMAS Sydney, Denham WA
 Swansea RSL Rising Sun Anzac Memorial
 100th ANZAC Dawn Across Australia
 Sydney Emden Friendship Mast
 Hugo Throssell VC 100th ANZAC Memorial
 The West Australian Irish Famine Memorial
 ANZAC Memorial, Upper Gascoyne WA

References 

1946 births
Living people
20th-century Australian women artists
20th-century Australian artists
20th-century sculptors
21st-century Australian women artists
21st-century Australian artists